The Diocese of Erfurt is a diocese of the Catholic church in Germany. The diocese was created in 1973 as the apostolic administration of Erfurt-Meiningen, and was elevated in 1994 to the current diocese of Erfurt. The diocese is a suffragan of the Archdiocese of Paderborn. 

After the former bishop Joachim Wanke resigned in 2012 the diocese was without bishop until November 2014 when Ulrich Neymeyr took office. Neymeyr served as auxiliary bishop in the Diocese of Mainz before being appointed as bishop of Erfurt.

Ordinaries
Hugo Aufderbeck † (23 Jul 1973 Appointed – 17 Jan 1981 Died) 
Joachim Wanke (17 Jan 1981 Succeeded – 1 October 2012 Retired)

References

 Entry at catholic-hierarchy.org

Erfurt
Erfurt
Erfurt